Bhubaneshwar–Visakhapatnam Intercity Express is a Superfast train running between Bhubaneswar and Visakhapatnam along the eastern coastal region of India. This train was introduced in the year 2001 from Palasa to Bhubaneswar later it extended to Srikakulam, Visakhapatnam. Earlier it was numbered as 18411/18412 but it was renumbered as 22819/22820 in the year 2016.

Coaches

It consists of 1 second sitting, 7 general second class, two guard cum luggage vans
Coach composition from Bhubaneswar to Visakhapatnam

Coach composition from Visakhapatnam to Bhubaneswar

Loco

It is hauled by WAM-4 of Visakhapatnam / Vijayawada / Asansol Loco sheds.

Trivia

During its inaugural in 2001, it ran 5 days a week between Bhubaneshwar and Palasa. After then it was extended to Srikakulam in the railway budget of 2002. After that its frequency was increased to 6 days a week. In 2012 it was made daily.

References

Transport in Bhubaneswar
Transport in Visakhapatnam
Intercity Express (Indian Railways) trains
Rail transport in Odisha
Rail transport in Andhra Pradesh